Sails.js (or Sails) is a model–view–controller (MVC) web application framework developed atop the Node.js environment, released as free and open-source software under the MIT License. It is designed to make it easy to build custom, enterprise-grade Node.js web applications and APIs. Emulating the MVC architecture of other frameworks, like Ruby on Rails, it offers similar pattern and familiarity, reducing the cognitive burden when switching between other frameworks/languages.

Features 
Sails.js offers a host of features and attributes. It is built on Node.js and Express.js, enabling applications to be made with 100% JavaScript. This includes models, views, controllers, configuration files, and adapters (e.g., database).
 
Like Ruby on Rails, Sails.js provides an object-relational mapping interface using Waterline.js, which abstracts the database interaction. This enables a uniform API regardless of the underlying database being used.
 
A number of other packages are included to enable fast auto-generated REST APIs, WebSockets by default using Socket.io; and compatibility features making it front-end agnostic so that many tools and frameworks (AngularJS, React.js, Android, iOS, etc.) are supported.

See also 

 JavaScript framework
 JavaScript library

References

External links 

JavaScript web frameworks
Web frameworks